The early romantic guitar, the guitar of the Classical and Romantic period, shows remarkable consistency from 1790 to 1830. Guitars had six or more single courses of strings while the Baroque guitar usually had five double courses (though the highest string might be single). The romantic guitar eventually led to Antonio de Torres Jurado's fan-braced Spanish guitars, the immediate precursors of the modern classical guitar.

From the late 18th century the guitar achieved considerable general popularity though, as Ruggero Chiesa stated, subsequent scholars have largely ignored its place in classical music. It was the era of guitarist-composers such as Fernando Sor, Ferdinando Carulli, Mauro Giuliani and Matteo Carcassi. In addition several well-known composers not generally linked with the guitar played or wrote for it: Luigi Boccherini and Franz Schubert wrote for it in several pieces, Hector Berlioz was a proficient guitarist who neither played keyboards nor received an academic education in music, the violin virtuoso Niccolò Paganini played guitar informally and Anton Diabelli produced a quantity of guitar compositions (see List of compositions by Anton Diabelli).

History 

The first known guitar built to be strung with single strings rather than pairs of strings was built in 1774 by Ferdinando Gagliano in Naples. This guitar, which was displayed in the Heyer Museum, Cologne before that museum was dispersed, showed some important differences from the modern classical guitar. It had 5 single strings, inlaid brass frets, a long neck relative to string length (the fretboard meeting the body at the 11th fret), a pegged bridge and a characteristic figure-8 shaped tuning head. It lacked only a sixth string to make it identical with the early romantic guitar.

The earliest extant six-string guitar was built in 1779 by Gaetano Vinaccia (1759 – after 1831) in Naples, Italy. The Vinaccia family of luthiers is also known for developing the mandolin. This guitar shows no sign of modification from a double-course guitar. The authenticity of guitars before the 1790s is often in question. Moretti's 6-string method appeared in 1792.

Around the same time France also began to produce guitars with six single courses and Spain soon followed. Italian, French, and Spanish six-string guitars differed from the baroque guitar in similar ways. In addition to the advances already mentioned the guitar was gradually given more pronounced curves and a larger body while ornamentation was more restrained, remaining mostly around the edges of the body and the sound hole, which lacked a decorative rose to allow more volume. Frets were no longer of tied gut but fixed strips of some harder material, first ebony or ivory then metal. Wooden pegs were later replaced by metal tuning machines.

Technique 

The many instructional books of the time show no standard playing technique but rather a reliance upon earlier traditions. For example, they often recommend that the right hand be supported on the guitar's table although the Spanish guitarist Nicario Juaralde took the modern view, warning against a loss of right-hand freedom. The thumb and first two fingers were mainly used for plucking with, in the 19th century, a free stroke (tirando) more commonly than the rest stroke (apoyando) that was favoured in the 20th century. Unlike most classical guitarists today, players were divided as to whether or not use fingernails. Fernando Sor, for example, did not use them while his compatriot Dionisio Aguado did.

The narrower fretboard of the romantic guitar allowed the left-hand thumb to be used by some guitarists to fret the sixth string although Fernando Sor deprecates this in his method, recommending that the left-hand thumb remain at the rear centre of the neck and noting that the "high" thumb position aids neither bass-string fingering nor support of the guitar. Romantic guitars often had a neck-strap around the player's neck while Dionisio Aguado invented a "tripodion" for holding the instrument. Aguado also advocated a relaxed posture, leaning back in a chair with both feet solidly on the ground rather than using a footstool to achieve the later conventional posture, the edge of the chair being used to keep the guitar from sliding down to the right, bringing the neck upward, closer to the player's torso, rather than projecting to the left.

Composers 

Antoine de Lhoyer (1768–1852)
Francesco Molino (1768–1847)
Ferdinando Carulli (1770–1841)
François de Fossa (1775–1849)
Joseph Küffner (1776–1856)
Fernando Sor (1778–1839)
Anton Diabelli (1781–1858)
Mauro Giuliani (1781–1829)
Dionisio Aguado (1784–1849)
Carl Blum (1786–1844)
Charles Michael Alexis Sola (1786–1857)
Matteo Carcassi (1792–1853)
Josiah Andrew Hudleston (1799–1865)
Johann Kaspar Mertz (1806–1856)
Napoléon Coste (1805–1883)
Adam Darr (1811–1866)
Eduard Bayer (1822–1908)
Giulio Regondi (1822–1872)
Jacques Bosch (1825–1895)
Julian Arcas (1832–1882)
Francisco Tárrega (1852–1909)

Luthiers 

 Johann Georg Stauffer
 René François Lacôte
 Jean Nicolas Grobert
 Christian Frederick Martin
 Antonio de Torres Jurado
 Louis Panormo
 Joseph Pons
 Etienne Laprevotte
 Gennaro Fabricatore

Further reading 
Heck, Thomas Fitzsimons: Mauro Giuliani: Virtuoso Guitarist and Composer. 1995. 
Heck, Thomas Fitzsimons: The Birth of the Classic Guitar and its Cultivation in Vienna, Reflected in the Career and Compositions of Mauro Giuliani (d. 1829). Yale University. 1970. (Thesis)
Ribouillault-Bibron, Danielle: La Technique de guitare en France dans la première moitié du XIXe siècle. 1980. (Thesis) 1
Walter, Adrian Charles: The Early Nineteenth-Century Guitar: An Interpretative Context for the Contemporary Performer, with a Specific Focus on the Compositions of Mauro Giuliani and Fernando Sor. 2008. (Thesis) 1
Frédéric Ben Attar, Frédéric Carpino and Ingrid Riollot: Les Guitares romantiques (Musée de la Lutherie et de l'Archèterie Françaises, Mirecourt) 1
Sinier de Ridder: La Guitare
La Guitare, tome I: Paris 1650–1950 1, 2
La Guitare, tome II: Mirecourt, les provinces françaises 1, 2
Erik Pierre Hofmann, Pascal Mougin, Stefan Hackl: Stauffer & Co. 1
Christof Hanusch: Masterpieces of German Instrument Making – "Weissgerber" Guitars by Richard Jacob 1, 2, 3
 James Westbrook: The Century that Shaped the Guitar. 2005.

References

External links 

 The guitar in the 19th century
 The guitar chamber trio from 1780 to 1830: its style and structure Thesis by Robert C Liew
 Franz Schubert's Chamber Music with Guitar: A Study of the Guitar's Role in Biedermeier Vienna by Stephen Mattingly

Classical guitar
Romantic music
Acoustic guitars